Syncdocs is backup and file synchronization software for Google Drive. Syncdocs uses cloud computing to enable users to back up and synchronize Windows computer files to Google Documents and Google Drive accounts.

Features 
 Full data migration to and from Google Drive cloud.
 The program supports editing of local Microsoft Office documents online using Google Docs.
 The Windows folder structure is replicated online.
 Ability to sync network folders and external USB drives to Google Drive.
 Up to 16 accounts can be synced to Google Drive concurrently.
 Synchronization of file and folder changes and contacts between Google and local computers.
 Compression Support.
 End-to-End Google Drive Encryption using 256 bit Advanced Encryption Standard
 File versioning and Unicode filename support.
 File sharing
 Drive mapping of Google Drive to a local drive letter.
The Google Drive client shares some of the same basic features as Syncdocs. The main differences are Syncdocs ability to sync multiple Google accounts concurrently and Syncdocs ability to sync any folders on the PC or network. However, Syncdocs does not have an OS X or Android client, which Google Drive does.

See also 
File synchronization
Comparison of file synchronization software
Backup
List of backup software
Dropbox
GDocsDrive
Google Drive

References

External links 
 http://www.syncdocs.com

Backup software
File hosting
Data synchronization
File sharing software
Cloud storage
Email attachment replacements
Online backup services
Cloud applications
File hosting for Windows